State Highway 150 (SH 150) is a  long state highway in southern Colorado. SH 150's southern terminus is at U.S. Route 160 (US 160) west of Blanca, and the northern terminus is at Great Sand Dunes National Park.

Route description

SH 150 begins in the south at its junction with US 160 roughly fifteen miles east of Alamosa and about six miles (10 km) east of Blanca. For much of its length the road heads arrow straight due north across the eastern margin of the broad, flat, nearly featureless San Luis Valley between the Sangre de Christo Mountains in the east and the San Juan Mountains to the west. The road eventually deviates from its due north heading as it approaches its northern endpoint at Great Sand Dunes National Park.

History
The first route to use the number 150 was established in the 1920s, when it connected SH 17 at Mosca to SH 69 at Gardner over Mosca Pass which is no longer maintained for automobile travel. The route was deleted by 1954 and resurrected in 1960, when it connected Mosca with the Great Sand Dunes National Park. This routing was deleted in 1973 and resurrected again to its current routing today the following year.

Major intersections

References

External links

150
Transportation in Alamosa County, Colorado
Transportation in Costilla County, Colorado